Francis Newton Parsons VC (23 March 1875 in Dover – 10 March 1900) was educated at Dover College, joined the Essex Regiment and served in the Second Boer War. He was an English recipient of the Victoria Cross, the highest and most prestigious award for gallantry in the face of the enemy that can be awarded to British and Commonwealth forces.

Military career
Parsons was a chorister educated at King's College School, Cambridge, from where he proceeded to Dover College, and then to the Royal Military College, Sandhurst, and on graduation was commissioned as a second lieutenant in the Essex Regiment on 28 February 1896. He was promoted to lieutenant on 1 March 1898.

Parsons was 24 years old, and in the 1st Battalion, The Essex Regiment, British Army, during the Second Boer War when the following deeds took place for which he was awarded the VC. He was recommended by Lieutenant-General Kelly-Kenny, C.B. for the award and the citation was published in the London Gazette of 20 November 1900:

Parsons also received a posthumous Mention in Despatches on 8 February 1901.

The medal
His Victoria Cross is displayed at The Essex Regiment Museum, Chelmsford, Essex, England.

References

Monuments to Courage (David Harvey, 1999)
The Register of the Victoria Cross (This England, 1997)
Victoria Crosses of the Anglo-Boer War (Ian Uys, 2000)

External links

 Dover College
 

1875 births
1900 deaths
People from Dover, Kent
People educated at Dover College
British military personnel killed in the Second Boer War
British recipients of the Victoria Cross
Second Boer War recipients of the Victoria Cross
Essex Regiment officers
British Army personnel of the Second Boer War
Graduates of the Royal Military College, Sandhurst
British Army recipients of the Victoria Cross
Choristers of the Choir of King's College, Cambridge
Military personnel from Kent
Burials in South Africa